Kim Wan (born 27 March 1961) is a former table tennis player from South Korea. From 1984 to 1988, he won several medals in double events in the Asian Table Tennis Championships. He also won a silver and a bronze medal in the Table Tennis World Cup in 1984 and 1986, respectively. He competed at the 1988 Summer Olympics.

References

1961 births
Living people
South Korean male table tennis players
Asian Games medalists in table tennis
Table tennis players at the 1982 Asian Games
Table tennis players at the 1986 Asian Games
Medalists at the 1982 Asian Games
Medalists at the 1986 Asian Games
Asian Games gold medalists for South Korea
Asian Games silver medalists for South Korea
Asian Games bronze medalists for South Korea
Olympic table tennis players of South Korea
Table tennis players at the 1988 Summer Olympics